Emma Leonie Malewski (born July 18, 2004) is a German artistic gymnast who represented Germany at the inaugural Junior World Championships. She is the 2022 European champion on the balance beam, and was part of the first German team to ever win a European team medal in women's artistic gymnastics.

Early life 
Malewski was born in Hamburg in 2004. She currently trains in Chemnitz.

Gymnastics career

Junior

2016–2017
In 2016 Malewski competed at both the German National Championships and the German Cup, where she placed ninth and fourth respectively.  She competed at the Turnkunst International competition where she helped her team finish sixth and individually she placed third in the espoir division.

In 2017 Malewski competed at the German National Championships where she placed second in the all-around behind Aiyu Zhu; however she won the gold medal on floor exercise.  She competed at the junior Swiss Cup where she helped her team finish first.

2018
Malewski competed at the 2018 City of Jesolo Trophy where she finished 17th in the all-around.  In May she competed at the German Junior National Championships where she won the bronze medal in the all-around.  Additionally she won the bronze on balance beam and uneven bars and won gold on floor exercise.  The following month Malewski competed at a friendly competition in Pieve di Soligo where she helped Germany place fourth and individually she placed thirteenth in the all-around.

In August Malewski was selected to represent Germany at the 2018 European Championships alongside Emelie Petz, Lisa Zimmermann, Lara Hinsberger, and Leonie Papke.  Together they finished seventh in the team final.

2019 
Malewski competed at the 2019 City of Jesolo Trophy  where she helped Germany finish seventh as a team and individually she finished seventh on the balance beam.  She next competed at the German National Championships where she won the all-around competition.  Additionally she placed first on uneven bars, balance beam, and floor exercise.  In June Malewski competed at the Flanders International Team Challenge in Ghent, Belgium.  Germany placed sixth in the team final.  Individually Malewski placed fifteenth in the all-around.

Malewski was selected to represent Germany at the inaugural Junior World Championships alongside Jasmin Haase and Lea Marie Quaas.  Together they finished eighth as a team and Malewski finished sixteenth in the all-around.

Senior

2020–21 
Malewski turned senior in 2020; however most competitions were canceled or postponed due to the COVID-19 pandemic.

In 2021 Malewski made her senior international debut at the European Championships.  She finished 40th during qualifications and did not advance to any event finals.  In June she competed at her first senior level national championships; she finished sixth in the all-around and third on balance beam.  In July she competed at the Flanders International Team Challenge where Germany placed sixth.  Individually Malewski placed eleventh in the all-around and fifth on balance beam.

2022
In June, Malewski competed at the German Championships, where she took the bronze medal in the all-around, as well as in the uneven bars and balance beam finals, and finished fifth in the floor final.

In August, Malewski competed at the European Championships in Munich, where she helped Germany qualify to the team final in fourth place. Individually, she also qualified to the balance beam final in second place. In the team final, the German team of Malewski, Kim Bui, Pauline Schäfer, Sarah Voss and Elisabeth Seitz won the bronze medal behind Italy and Great Britain — Germany's first team medal in European Championship history. In the beam final, Malewski won the gold medal ahead of Ondine Achampong and Carolann Héduit with a score of 13.466.

Competitive history

References

External links 
 Emma Malewski on the Turn-Team Deutschland website
 

2004 births
Living people
German female artistic gymnasts
Sportspeople from Chemnitz
Sportspeople from Hamburg
21st-century German women
European champions in gymnastics